Orba is a small town and municipality in the comarca of Marina Alta in the Valencian Community, Spain.

It is situated in the River Gerona valley and is bordered by Pego to the north; Benidoleig and Ondara to the north-east; Jalón and Pedreguer to the east and Parcent and Alcalali to the south.

The town has many commercial premises including mini-supermarkets, restaurants and cafe-bars, hair stylist salons and a barbers shop. The town is also well served with four banks, two builders merchants and two estate agents. In addition to the indigenous population, the town and surrounding area is now home to expatriates from throughout the European Union, many of whom are permanent residents and are gainfully employed within the local community.

References

External links
 
 Orba Information

Municipalities in the Province of Alicante